Bloody River is a river of the North American Arctic tundra in Nunavut and the Northwest Territories, Canada.

An outcrop of Saline River gypsum was noted near Bloody River,  (NTS 86 M)* +27.2
15.
W. Kupsch "found tails of till-covered bedrock behind eroded rock bosses and referred to such compound landforms as crag-and-tail drumlins" west of Bloody River.

See also
List of rivers of the Northwest Territories
List of rivers of Nunavut

References

Rivers of Kitikmeot Region
Rivers of the Northwest Territories